At the Battle of Smoliani (November 13–14, 1812), the Russians under General Peter Wittgenstein defeated the French forces of Marshal Claude Victor and Marshal Nicholas Oudinot. This battle was the last effort of the French to reestablish their northern flank in Russia, known as the "Dwina Line". Previously, the French had been defeated in this sector at the Second battle of Polotsk (October 18–20, 1812) and at the Battle of Czasniki (October 31, 1812)

Background
Upon learning of Victor's defeat at the Battle of Czasniki, Napoleon – who was already distressed about the situation in the north due to the earlier French defeat at Polotsk – ordered Victor to assume the offensive at once and drive Wittgenstein back.

At the time of the Smoliani encounter, Napoleon was planning on leading his rapidly disintegrating Grande Armée to a safehaven in the west such as Minsk. In order to execute this plan, the Grande Armée's planned route of retreat had to be secured.

Victor, per Napoleon's orders, was to coordinate the actions of his IX corps with the VI corps and the II corps commanded by Marshal Oudinot. The initial French plan – ordered by Napoleon and endorsed by Victor, was not to attack Wittgenstein frontally, but for one corps to attack the Russians in the flank while the other conducted a frontal assault. This plan however was scuttled per the insistence of Oudinot, who thought it more advantageous to attack Wittgenstein head on.

The contrasting moods In Russian and French headquarters
Going into the action at Smoliani, the French commanders exhibited the hallmarks of leaders setting themselves up for failure: bad planning, indecision and pessimism due to earlier reversals.

Historians have criticized Oudinot and Victor for not attempting a flanking maneuver against Wittgenstein. Victor especially has been criticized for indecision in his planning and execution of the Smoliani attack. Previously, at Czasniki, Victor had proven himself over-inclined to retreat in the face of just minor reversals.

The mood among the Russian leaders on the eve of the battle stood in stark contrast to that of the French.

In Wittgenstein's headquarters at this time, there existed a "sense of self-confidence and proud accomplishment", which had coalesced as a result of their repeated victories over the French in earlier battles. One notable work on 1812 describes the aura among Wittgenstein and his staff at this juncture as a sense of being "morally equal and often superior to the enemy." It is no wonder, perhaps, that Victor was hesitant in executing the task assigned to him by Napoleon.

Severe attrition among French forces
The French cause at Smoliani was also undermined by mounting attrition within their ranks.

In the two weeks following the action at Czasniki, Victor's force had suffered greatly from exposure to frost and disease. By November 10, only 25,000 troops remained under Victor's command, a development that increased Wittgenstein's margin of superiority over the French in this sector. As a result of being better supplied, better quartered and more intelligently protected from the elements than their French foes, Wittgenstein's troops suffered less attrition from privation and the weather.

The battle

The Battle of Smoliani commenced on November 13, at the nearby village of Axenzi, and initially the French were successful. Here the 6,000 troops of General Louis Partouneaux attacked Wittgenstein's advance guard, 6,000 strong, led by General Alexiev. Each side lost roughly 500 troops in this encounter, and despite being reinforced, the Russians were forced to retreat to Smoliani.

The next day, November 14, the combat intensified as 5,000 of Victor's troops attacked and captured Smoliani. After this, however, the French attacking force suffered a reversal, being repulsed on the Russian right wing and then losing Smoliani to Wittgenstein's counterattack. While this action was taking place, a small Russian detachment kept Oudinot's superior force in check at the village of Poczavizi, thereby preventing these troops from assisting Victor.

Although the action died down with each side in their original position, and the losses suffered by both were equal – 3,000 killed, wounded and taken prisoner – it was the French who very much had the worst of the scrap. The next day, November 15, Victor retreated 20 miles south to Chereja.

Consequences
That Victor and Oudinot retreated in the face of this big threat to the Grande Armée was another heavy blow to Napoleon. The Battle of Smoliani also ended, permanently, any hope the French had of reestablishing their northern "Dwina Line."

See also
List of battles of the French invasion of Russia

Notes

References
Napoleon In Russia: A Concise History of 1812, 2004, Digby Smith, Pen & Sword Military, 
The War of the Two Emperors, Curtis Cate, Random House, New York, 
The Greenhill Napoleonic Wars Data Source, 1998, Digby Smith, Greenhill Books, 
1812 Napoleon's Russian Campaign, Richard K. Riehn, John Wiley & Sons, Inc.,

External links

Battles of the French invasion of Russia
Battles of the Napoleonic Wars
Battles involving France
Battles involving Russia
Conflicts in 1812
November 1812 events
1812 in the Russian Empire
1812 in Belarus
Vitebsk Region
Military history of Belarus